Giordano Maioli (born 27 September 1943), is an Italian former tennis player.

Biography
He won six medals at the Summer Universiade from 1963 to 1967. In 1966 he won the Italian Tennis Championships and has played 19 times in Davis Cup. He reached the third round of the singles event at the 1967 Wimbledon Championships. He is currently General Manager of Alpina Maglierie Sportive S.p.A., a manufacturer of sportswear under the brand Australian.

Achievements

References

External links
 
 
 

1943 births
Living people
Italian male tennis players
Universiade medalists in tennis
Mediterranean Games bronze medalists for Italy
Mediterranean Games medalists in tennis
Competitors at the 1967 Mediterranean Games
Universiade gold medalists for Italy
Universiade silver medalists for Italy
Universiade bronze medalists for Italy
Sportspeople from Piacenza
Medalists at the 1967 Summer Universiade